Ingen Ryūki (December 7, 1592 – May 19, 1673) was a Chinese poet, calligrapher, and monk of Linji Chan Buddhism from China. He is most known for founding the Ōbaku school of Zen in Japan.

Biography
Ingen was born on December 7, 1592, in Fuqing, Fujian, during China's Ming dynasty. Ingen's father disappeared when he was five.  At age 20, while searching for him, Ingen arrived at Mount Putuo off Zhejiang province, where he served tea to monks. At 28, after the death of his mother, he was ordained as a monk at his family temple - Wanfu Temple, Mount Huangbo, Fujian. Ingen's teachers there were Miyun Yuanwu and Feiyin Tongrong. In 1633 he received dharma transmission from the latter, and in 1637 served his first term as abbot. His second term as 33rd abbot of the temple began in 1646 and at this time he is credited with helping Mount Huangbo to develop into a thriving Buddhist centre.

In 1654, after repeated requests of Itsunen Shoyu, he went to Nagasaki, Japan with around 30 monks and artisans, including his disciple Muyan. He founded the Ōbaku school of Zen. He established the Ōbaku head temple Manpuku-ji at Uji, Kyoto in 1661.

On May 21, 1673 (Enpō 1, 5th day of the 4th month), he died at Mampuku-ji.

Calligraphy
Ingen was a skilled calligrapher, introducing the Ming style of calligraphy to Japan.  Along with his disciples Muyan and Sokuhi Nyoitsu, he was one of the Ōbaku no Sanpitsu ("Three Brushes of Ōbaku"). He is known to have carried paintings by Chen Xian with him to Japan.

Selected work
Ingen's published writings encompass 35 works in 46 publications in 4 languages and 226 library holdings.

 1979 —

See also
Egoku Dōmyō

Notes

References
 Nussbaum, Louis Frédéric and Käthe Roth. (2005). Japan Encyclopedia. Cambridge: Harvard University Press. ; OCLC 48943301
 Titsingh, Isaac. (1834). Annales des empereurs du Japon.  Paris: Oriental Translation Fund of Great Britain and Ireland.  OCLC 251800045; see also  Imprimerie Royale de France, 

Qing dynasty Buddhist monks
Obaku Buddhists
Zen Buddhist abbots
1592 births
1673 deaths
Chinese Zen Buddhists
Rinzai Buddhists
Ming dynasty calligraphers
Qing dynasty calligraphers
Writers from Fuzhou
Artists from Fuzhou
Poets from Fujian
Qing dynasty poets
Chan Buddhist monks
Ming dynasty Buddhist monks
17th-century Buddhist monks
Chinese tea masters
Buddhist artists
Edo period Buddhist clergy
17th-century Chinese calligraphers
17th-century Japanese calligraphers